Simbari or Chimbari, is an Angan language of Papua New Guinea.

There are at least two dialects of Simbari. The Simbari language is partly cognate with Baruya.

Simbari is spoken by the Simbari people. Simbari culture and society have received extensive anthropological studies, especially by Gilbert Herdt.

See also
Sambia Sexual Culture

Bibliography
Phonological sketches
Lloyd, Richard G. 1973a. The Angan language family. In: Franklin (ed.), 31–110.
Lloyd, Richard G. 1973b. The Angan language family: Neighbouring languages. In: Franklin (ed.), 93–94.

References

Languages of Gulf Province
Languages of Eastern Highlands Province
Angan languages